Director of National Parks is a government-owned corporation of the Australian government responsible for the management of a portfolio of terrestrial and marine protected areas proclaimed under the Environment Protection and Biodiversity Conservation Act 1999 (EPBC Act).  The agency is a corporation sole.

Parks Australia (formerly the  Australian Nature Conservation Agency and the Australian National Parks and Wildlife Service) is a division of the Department of Agriculture, Water and the Environment which supports the Director of National Parks in the management of six Commonwealth national parks, the Australian National Botanic Gardens, and Australian marine parks.

Legal status and history
The Director of National Parks was established under the EPBC Act as a corporation sole, i.e. the corporation is constituted by the person appointed to the office named the Director of National Parks.

It was established on 17 July 2000 upon the proclamation of the EPBC Act and is a continuation of the office of the Director of National Parks and Wildlife which existed under the National Parks and Wildlife Conservation Act 1975.

As of May 2018, the office is held in an acting capacity by Dr. Judy West who succeeds Sally Barnes who was director from 2014 to 2018 and Peter Cochrane who was director from 1999 to 2013.

Responsibilities
The Director of National Parks’ responsibilities under the EPBC Act include:
 Managing Commonwealth reserves and conservation zones
 Protecting biodiversity and heritage in Commonwealth reserves and conservation zones
 Carrying out research relevant to Commonwealth reserves
 Cooperating with other countries to establish and manage national parks and nature reserves in those countries
 Making recommendations to the Australian Government Minister for the Environment.

Portfolio and delegations
The Director of National Parks’ portfolio consists of the following groups of protected areas:
 Six Commonwealth national parks
 The Australian National Botanic Gardens 
 58 Australian marine parks and
 One Commonwealth marine reserve.

The management of the Heard Island and McDonald Islands Commonwealth Marine Reserve has been delegated by the Director of National Parks to the Australian Antarctic Division, another agency within the Department of the Environment and Energy.

The portfolio does not include the Great Barrier Reef Marine Park because this protected area is managed by another departmental agency, the Great Barrier Reef Marine Park Authority.

Parks Australia
Parks Australia (formerly the  Australian Nature Conservation Agency and the Australian National Parks and Wildlife Service) is a division of the Department of Agriculture, Water and the Environment since 2020 (previously the Department of the Environment and Energy). Parks Australia staff are part of the federal environment portfolio. It supports the Director of National Parks in the management of six Commonwealth national parks, the Australian National Botanic Gardens, and Australian Marine Parks.

For the financial year 2016-17, Parks Australia had a staffing level averaging at 321 people and consisted for four sections reporting directly to the Director of National Parks and the following three branches – the Joint Management Branch, the Marine Protected Areas Branch and the Parks Island & Biodiversity Science Branch.

See also
National Parks and Wildlife Service (New South Wales)
Protected areas managed by the Australian government

References

External links

Links to state agencies
 (state agencies and major Commonwealth-managed parks)

 
Protected area administrators of Australia
Government-owned companies of Australia